Stelocyon is an extinct genus of triisodontid mesonychid from the Paleocene of North America.

References

External links
Science
Stelocyon Data

Mesonychids
Paleocene mammals of North America
Prehistoric placental genera